Turkey was present at the Eurovision Song Contest 1986, held in Bergen, Norway. They were represented by "Halley" performed by the quintet Klips ve Onlar (Sevingül Bahadır, Gür Akad, Emre Tukur, Derya Bozkurt and Seden Kutlubay). The song was composed by Melih Kibar with lyrics by İlhan İrem.

Before Eurovision

10. Eurovision Şarkı Yarışması Türkiye Finali 
The final took place on 15 March 1986 at the Ari TV studios in Ankara, hosted by Erkan Yolaç. Four songs competed and the winner was determined by a sixteen-member jury. As there was a tie at the end of the voting, the head of the jury ended up having his vote counted twice, resulting in the victory of "Halley" performed by Klips ve Onlar.

At Eurovision 
Klips ve Onlar performed eighth on the night of the contest, following the Netherlands and preceding Spain. Before competing in Bergen, Seden Kutlubay was replaced in the quintet with Candan Erçetin.

At the close of the voting the song had received 53 points, placing 9th in a field of 20 competing countries. It was the best ranking Turkey had received in the Contest up to that time, and will remain so until 1997.

The members of the Turkish jury included Ayça Eren, Ziya Anadol, Kaan Bozoğlu, Ayşegül Soyalp, Özlem Budakoğlu, Fatma Dikmen, Alaaddin Torun, İlhan Aslanboğan, Zahide Azılı, Saadet Aktemel, and Suhal Eriş.

Voting

References

External links
Turkish National Final 1986

1986
Countries in the Eurovision Song Contest 1986
Eurovision